Kengtung, also spelt Kyaingtong, is a town in Shan State, Myanmar (formerly Burma). It is the principal town of Kengtung Township and the former seat of Kengtung State, a minor principality. Kengtung is located on the National Highway 4 (NH4) and at the AH2 and AH3 of the Asian Highway.

Etymology 
Owing to Kengtung's proximity to China and Thailand, the city is known by a number of exonyms and endonyms. The endonym used by Tai Khun and Tai Lue-speaking locals is Jeng Tung (ᨾᩨ᩠ᨦᨩᩭᨦᨲᩩᨦ) respectively. Other Shan speakers use the exonym Kengtung. The most common exonym, Kyaingtong, is derived from the Burmese approximation of Kengtung. The exonym of Chiang Tung is used by Thai speakers, while Chinese speakers use Jingdong.

History

The early history of Kengtung is made up of myths and legends. The oral tradition of the [Tai people] says that the ancient city of Kengtung was founded in the distant past by Tai Lue as the original inhabitants of the region, and was later reestablished by the grandson of King Mangrai after defeating the Tai Lue. This migration of the Chiang Mai dynasty in the 13th century, with the founding a new kingdom which was later named Lanna, has resulted in Kengtung having a different type of Tai population from the rest of the Shan State, the Tai Khün.

Kengtung, like other major towns in the Shan Plateau, was home to a Shan Saopha (Sawbwa). Kengtung was the capital of the Kengtung State, and had a palace, built by Sao Kawng Kiao Intaleng in 1905.

The city was seized and occupied by the Thai Phayap Army from 1942 until the end of the Second World War and became the headquarters of the Saharat Thai Doem territory. The headquarters of the regional military command of the Tatmadaw is in the town.

Geography
Kengtung contains several lakes. The largest, Naung Tung Lake, lies in the western part of the city, followed by Naung Kham Lake and Naung Yarng Lake to the south of the Kentung Roman Catholic Mission.

Transportation
The town is served by Kengtung Airport.

Kengtung is located on the National Highway 4 (NH4) and at the AH2 and AH3 of the Asian Highway.

Climate

Kengtung has a tropical wet and dry/ savanna climate (Köppen-Geiger classification: Aw) with a pronounced dry season in the low-sun months, no cold season, wet season is in the high-sun months. Temperatures are very warm throughout the year, although the winter months (December–February) are milder and nights can be quite cool. There is a winter dry season (December–April) and a summer wet season (May–November).

Education
 Keng Tung University
 Keng Tung Computer University
 Keng Tung Technological University

Health care
 Keng Tung General Hospital

See also
 Maha Myat Muni Temple
 Wat Zom Khum
 Tachileik
 Kengtung District

Bibliography
 Forbes, Andrew ; Henley, David (2011). Traders of the Golden Triangle. Chiang Mai: Cognoscenti Books. ASIN: B006GMID5
 J. G. Scott, Gazetteer of Upper Burma and the Shan States. 5 vols. Rangoon, 1900-1901.
 Sao Sāimöng Mangrāi, The Pādaeng Chronicle and the Kengtung State Chronicle Translated. University of Michigan, Ann Arbor, 1981

External links 

 The Happy City, a 1959 film on a remote leper colony run by Father Cesare Columbo in Kengtung, Shan State
  pictures from Kengtung

References

Notes

 
Populated places in Shan State